Palù is a comune in the province of Verona in northern Italy.

References

External links

Official website

Cities and towns in Veneto